La Périchole is an opéra bouffe in three acts by Jacques Offenbach. Henri Meilhac and Ludovic Halévy wrote the French libretto based on the 1829 one act play Le carrosse du Saint-Sacrement by Prosper Mérimée, which was revived on 13 March 1850 at the Théâtre-Français. Offenbach was probably aware of this production, as he conducted the orchestra of the Comédie-Française from around this time.  Another theatrical creation that pre-dates Offenbach's opéra bouffe and may have influenced the piece is a farce by Desforges and Théaulon given on 21 October 1835 at the Théâtre du Palais-Royal.

La Péricholes title character is based on Micaela Villegas, a beloved 18th century Peruvian entertainer and the famous mistress of Manuel de Amat y Juniet, Viceroy of Peru from 1761 to 1776.  The story concerns two impoverished Peruvian street-singers, too poor to afford a marriage license, and a lecherous viceroy, Don Andrès de Ribeira, who wishes to make La Périchole his mistress.

The score is in what Andrew Lamb calls Offenbach's "most charming", rather than satirical style, with boleros, seguidillas and galops to provide the exotic backdrop. Highlights include La Périchole's letter song, O mon cher amant; her "tipsy" aria, Ah! quel dîner!; and (for the 1874 revision) her third-act aria to Piquillo, Tu n'es pas beau, tu n'es pas riche, Offenbach's last major song for Hortense Schneider.

Performance history
Early productions
The work premiered, in a two-act version, on 6 October 1868, at the Théâtre des Variétés, Paris, with Hortense Schneider in the title role and José Dupuis as Piquillo.  The three-act version premiered at the same theater on 25 April 1874, again starring Schneider and Dupuis. A revival of the revised version took place at the Théâtre des Variétés on 9 March 1877 with Anna Judic in the title role, with Dupuis and Dailly. It was not seen again in Paris until 1895, but has been staged regularly in France since then.

Outside France, La Périchole was first seen in Brussels on 5 December 1868, then in New York City at Pike's Opera House on 4 January 1869, Vienna on 9 January 1869, Stockholm on 6 February 1869, and London on 27 June 1870 at the Princess's Theatre, with South American premieres in Rio de Janeiro in 1869 and Buenos Aires in 1870. It also had a run in New York City at the Grand Opera House beginning on 18 January 1871.  La Périchole played a part in the development of English comic opera when, on 25 March 1875 at the Royalty Theatre in London, it played (in English) on a triple bill with Charles Collette's one-act farce Cryptoconchoidsyphonostomata and Gilbert and Sullivan's Trial by Jury, the latter of which was written specifically to be a companion piece for La Périchole.  Trial became a hit and led to the famous series of Savoy Operas.

Broadcasts
La Périchole has been produced on French television and radio over many years. The first radio broadcast was in 1928, then, among others 1946 and 1949 (with Fanély Revoil), 1950 (with Denise Duval and Joseph Peyron), and 1968 with Maria Murano, Michel Caron and Jean Brun. The first televised broadcast was in 1952 (with Revoil and Lenoty), then a recording of a performance at the Gaîté-Lyrique in June 1956 with Murano, and in 1971 (from the Théâtre de Paris) and 1981 (from the Carpentras Festival).

The Metropolitan Opera production
On 21 December 1956, the Metropolitan Opera premiered a new version that included interpolations from other scores and turned the speaking role of the Old Prisoner into a singing role for a comic tenor.  The title role was changed from mezzo-soprano to coloratura soprano, and Piquillo, renamed Paquillo, was changed from tenor to high baritone.  The production was directed by Cyril Ritchard and starred Patrice Munsel in the title role, Theodor Uppman as Paquillo, and Ritchard himself as Andres. There were a total of 54 performances of the version through the last Met performance in Detroit on 27 May 1971.  Munsel sang in 21 performances, Teresa Stratas sang in 16 of the performances in the title role, Uppman appeared in all the performances, and Ritchard sang in 49 of the performances.

Roles

Synopsis

Place: Lima, Peru

Act 1
The Plaza

In the main square of Lima, outside The Three Cousins tavern, the crowd is celebrating the birthday of Don Andrès de Ribeira, the Viceroy of Peru. Don Pedro de Hinoyosa (Mayor of Lima), Count Miguel de Panatellas (First Gentleman of the Bedchamber), and Don Andrès enter in disguise. Everyone recognizes them but pretends not to. La Périchole and Piquillo, poor young street singers, arrive in the square, trying to raise money for their marriage license. They please the crowd with romantic duets, but some acrobats entice the crowd away before they can collect any money. Piquillo sets off, hoping for better luck elsewhere, while Périchole escapes hunger in sleep.

The Viceroy, enchanted with her beauty, offers her a position as Lady in Waiting at the court as soon as she awakes.  Despite her suspicions about what he has in mind, she is persuaded by his offer of banquets and accepts, writing a loving farewell letter to Piquillo. Since all Ladies in Waiting must be married, Don Pedro and Panatellas leave to search for a husband for Périchole. They find Piquillo, who is about to hang himself after reading Périchole's farewell letter.  After plenty to drink, Piquillo reluctantly agrees to marry the Viceroy's new favorite, although he does not know who it is. Périchole has also been plied with drink by the Viceroy ("Ah, quel diner"), but she agrees to the marriage when she recognizes Piquillo.  He does not recognize his veiled bride, but he goes through with the marriage after warning her that he is in love with someone else.  They are taken to the Viceroy's palace.

Act 2
The Palace

The next morning, four ladies of the court gossip with the Marquis de Tarapote, Chamberlain of the Viceroy, about the Viceroy's new favorite. Piquillo arrives and is astonished to find that he is married to an unknown woman, the new mistress of the Viceroy.  He tells the Mayor and First Gentleman that he loves another woman.  He demands his payment so that he can go in search of Périchole, but they tell him that he must present his new wife to the Viceroy first. When Périchole appears, resplendent in her new court finery, Piquillo is crushed and throws her to the floor in front of the Viceroy instead of formally presenting her. Don Andres orders him to the dungeon for recalcitrant husbands.

Act 3
Scene 1: The Dungeon

In the dark and gloomy dungeon, an old prisoner enters through a trap door.  After digging through the wall of his cell for twelve years with his tiny pen knife, he has finally emerged, unfortunately into another cell. He retreats to his cell when Don Pedro and Panatellas bring Piquillo in. Piquillo mourns the loss of both his lover and his freedom and eventually falls asleep. Périchole enters, tells Piquillo that she has remained true to him, and they renew their vows. Périchole tries to bribe a jailor, with jewels the Viceroy has given her, to buy Piquillo's freedom, but the jailor is the Viceroy in disguise. He calls the guards, and the lovers are chained to the dungeon wall. But the Viceroy still hopes to win Périchole and tells her to sing if she changes her mind and decides to cooperate. The old prisoner enters through his passage and releases them from the chains.  Périchole sings, and when the Viceroy enters, the three prisoners chain him to the wall and escape.

Scene 2: The Plaza

The three fugitives hide in The Three Cousins tavern as the Viceroy and his soldiers search for them in the plaza outside. Périchole and Piquillo, dressed as street performers, plead for their freedom with a ballad about clemency that flatters the Viceroy. He forgives the couple and allows Périchole to keep the jewels he has given her. Meanwhile, the old prisoner has turned out to be the long lost Marquis of Santarém. The Viceroy is happy to pardon him as well (and no one can remember what his original crime was supposed to be), rather than send him back to destroy more walls in prison.

Recordings 

 1948: S Golemba, G Polyakov, V Kandelaki, S Tsenine, V Fedossov. National Musical Theatre of Moscow, cond. A. Alevladov & A.  Akulov. Melodia
 1957: Patrice Munsel, Theodor Uppman, Cyril Ritchard, Paul Franke, Ralph Herbert. Metropolitan Opera New York, cond. Jean Morel. RCA
 1958: Suzanne Lafaye, Raymond Amade, Louis Noguéra, Jean-Christophe Benoît, Chœurs René Duclos, Orchestre des concerts Lamoureux, cond. Igor Markevitch. EMI
 1976: Régine Crespin, Alain Vanzo, Jules Bastin, Gérard Friedmann, Jacques Trigeau, Aime Besançon, Paul Guigue, Rebecca Roberts, Eva Saurova, Germaine Baudoz, Ine Meister. Opéra du Rhin Chorus, Strasbourg Philharmonic Orchestra, cond. Alain Lombard. Erato
 1981: Teresa Berganza, José Carreras, Gabriel Bacquier, Chœur et Orchestre du Capitole de Toulouse, cond. Michel Plasson. EMI
 1982: Maria Ewing, Neil Rosenshein, Gabriel Bacquier, Paolo Martinelli, Ricardo Cassinelli. Chœur de Grand-Théâtre, Orchestre de la Suisse Romande, cond. Marc Soustrot. Gala
 2018: Aude Extremo, Stanislas de Barbeyrac, Alexandre Duhamel, Choeur de l'Opéra national de Bordeaux, Les Musiciens du Louvre, cond. Marc Minkowski. Bru-Zane
Jennie Tourel recorded four airs from La Périchole on Columbia in 1947; these were later reissued on Pearl.
 Recordings on operadis-opera-discography.org.uk

Other operatic versions of the play by Prosper Mérimée
 Le carrosse du Saint-Sacrement by Lord Berners is a one-act comic opera first performed at the Trianon-Lyrique, Paris in 1923.
 Le carrosse du Saint-Sacrement by Henri Busser is a one-act comédie lyrique, first performed at the Opéra-Comique, Paris on 2 June 1948.

References
Notes

Sources
Lamb, Andrew, "La Périchole", The New Grove Dictionary of Opera, ed. Stanley Sadie (London, 1992)

External links
Libretto submitted for censorship, Paris, 1868
Libretto in WikiSource
German libretto submitted for censorship, Vienna, 1868
MetOpera database listing of performances of La Périchole

Operas by Jacques Offenbach
Opéras bouffes
French-language operas
Operas
1868 operas
Operas set in Peru
Operas based on works by Prosper Mérimée